The Unpardonable Sin is a 1919 American silent drama/propaganda film set during World War I. The film was produced by Harry Garson, directed by Marshall Neilan, written by Kathryn Stuart, and stars Neilan's wife, Blanche Sweet, who portrays dual roles in the film. The Unpardonable Sin is based on the novel of the same name by Rupert Hughes. The Silent Era site reports that it is not known whether the film currently survives, suggesting that it is a lost film.  However, prints and/or fragments did turn up in the Dawson Film Find in 1978, so some of it at least survives.

Plot
As described in a film magazine, the film follows two American sisters, Alice and Dimny Parcot (Sweet in a dual role). Alice and their mother (Alden) are stranded in Belgium when World War I breaks out. Both are raped by German soldiers. Dimny, who is still in the United States, is found by Nol Windsor (Moore), a medical instructor, in a faint on the street. He takes her to his home and learns she is bound for Belgium in search of her mother and sister. Nol is going over to Belgium for the Commission for Relief in Belgium, and they apply for passports at the same time. Dimny is refused a passport because she is single, so they agree to marry in name only to facilitate their travel. In Belgium they meet Colonel Klemm, the German officer who outraged her sister Alice, and he mistakes Dimny for his victim. After undergoing many insults and affronts, Nol and Dimny finally find Alice and her mother, secure passports for them, and they start for the Dutch border. When Colonel Klemm lures Dimny to his quarters and attacks her, Nol arrives in time to rescue her, and a race to the border begins. They eventually escape and Nol and Dimny find happiness.

Cast
Blanche Sweet as Alice Parcot / Dimny Parcot
 Edwin Stevens as Stephen Parcot
Mary Alden as Mrs. Parcot
Matt Moore as Nol Windsor
Wesley Barry as George Washington Sticker
Wallace Beery as Colonel Klemm
Bull Montana as The Brute
Bobby Connelly as Boy Scout
Dick Curtis (uncredited)
John De Lacey (uncredited)

Reception
Like many American films of the time, The Unpardonable Sin was subject to cuts by city and state film censorship boards. For example, upon its release, the film was banned by the Kansas Board of Review due to its depiction of rape. The censorship board of Milwaukee, Wisconsin, initially banned the film but after protests in the press authorized the showing of the film with cuts, in Reel 1, of the scene showing Blanche Sweet standing against the wall with clothing disheveled and the shadow of a soldier next to her, Reel 2, portion of scene with Belgian priest where he falls, the intertitle "On every side the cruel reminder of motherhood.", scene of soldiers using machine gun on people and people falling, Reel 4, the intertitle "At Malines they encountered Suslich, whose specialty is searching pretty women. He to whom chastity is hard should be counseled against it.", and to eliminate all searching of woman scenes where her clothing is torn off by brutal soldiers.

See also
War rape
Blanche Sweet filmography

References

External links

 
 

1919 films
1910s war drama films
American silent feature films
American war drama films
American World War I propaganda films
American black-and-white films
Films based on American novels
Films based on works by Rupert Hughes
Films directed by Marshall Neilan
Films set in Belgium
American independent films
Films about rape
1910s independent films
1919 drama films
Censored films
1910s American films
Silent American drama films
Silent war drama films
1910s English-language films